Chillón is a municipality in Ciudad Real, Castile-La Mancha, Spain. It has a population of 2,271.

References

Municipalities in the Province of Ciudad Real